The 2020 Players Championship was the 47th edition of The Players Championship, scheduled for March 12–15 at TPC Sawgrass in Ponte Vedra Beach, Florida. It was canceled by the PGA Tour prior to the second round in response to the COVID-19 pandemic; the tour had earlier announced that the tournament would proceed behind closed doors for the remaining three days.

Hideki Matsuyama held a two stroke lead after the first round having equaled the course record of 63, nine under par. Defending champion Rory McIlroy was at even par (72), tied for 83rd place. Half of the $15 million purse was split equally among the 144 competing players, at $52,000 each.

The event was not included in the revised schedule announced in early April 2020.

Venue

Course layout

Field
The field consists of 144 players meeting the following criteria:

1. Winners of PGA Tour events since last Players

Patrick Cantlay (2,8,9)
Paul Casey (2,9)
Cameron Champ (2)
Corey Conners (2)
Tyler Duncan
Dylan Frittelli (2)
Lanto Griffin (13)
Tyrrell Hatton (2,8,9)
Jim Herman
Max Homa (2)
Viktor Hovland
Im Sung-jae (2,9,13)
Kang Sung-hoon (2)
Kevin Kisner (2,7,9)
Brooks Koepka (2,4,7,9)
Andrew Landry (2)
Nate Lashley (2)
Marc Leishman (2,9)
Shane Lowry (2,4,9)
Graeme McDowell (2,9)
Rory McIlroy (2,5,6,8,9,13)
Collin Morikawa (2)
Sebastián Muñoz (2,13)
Kevin Na (2,9,13)
Joaquín Niemann (2)
Ryan Palmer (2)
J. T. Poston (2)
Jon Rahm (2,9)
Chez Reavie (2,9)
Patrick Reed (2,4,7,9,13)
Adam Scott (2,9)
Webb Simpson (2,5,9,13)
Cameron Smith (2,9)
Nick Taylor (2)
Justin Thomas (2,4,6,9,13)
Brendon Todd (13)
Matthew Wolff (2)
Gary Woodland (2,4,9)

Pan Cheng-tsung (2) and Tiger Woods (2,4,6,9) did not play.

2. Top 125 from previous season's FedEx Cup points list

An Byeong-hun (9)
Abraham Ancer (9)
Kiradech Aphibarnrat
Ryan Armour
Aaron Baddeley
Keegan Bradley
Scott Brown
Sam Burns
Rafa Cabrera-Bello (9)
Bud Cauley
Wyndham Clark
Joel Dahmen
Jason Day (4,5,9)
Bryson DeChambeau (8,9)
Matt Every
Tony Finau (9)
Tommy Fleetwood (9)
Rickie Fowler (5,9)
Jim Furyk
Sergio García (4,9)
Brice Garnett
Brian Gay
Lucas Glover
Talor Gooch
Branden Grace
Emiliano Grillo
Chesson Hadley
Adam Hadwin
Brian Harman
Russell Henley
Charley Hoffman
J. B. Holmes
Billy Horschel (9)
Charles Howell III
Mackenzie Hughes
Dustin Johnson (4,9)
Matt Jones
Kim Si-woo (5)
Patton Kizzire
Russell Knox
Jason Kokrak
Matt Kuchar (9)
Martin Laird
Danny Lee
Lee Kyoung-hoon
Luke List
Adam Long
Peter Malnati
Hideki Matsuyama (7,9,13)
Denny McCarthy
Troy Merritt
Phil Mickelson (7)
Keith Mitchell
Francesco Molinari (4,8,9)
Ryan Moore
Louis Oosthuizen (9)
Carlos Ortiz
Pat Perez
Scott Piercy
Ian Poulter
Andrew Putnam
Patrick Rodgers
Justin Rose (7,9)
Sam Ryder
Rory Sabbatini
Xander Schauffele (6,7,9)
Adam Schenk
Roger Sloan
Brandt Snedeker (9)
J. J. Spaun
Jordan Spieth (4)
Scott Stallings
Kyle Stanley
Henrik Stenson (4,9)
Sepp Straka
Kevin Streelman
Chris Stroud
Brian Stuard
Vaughn Taylor
Michael Thompson
Cameron Tringale
Kevin Tway
Harold Varner III
Jhonattan Vegas
Nick Watney
Bubba Watson (7,9)
Danny Willett (4,9)
Aaron Wise

Jonas Blixt and Kelly Kraft did not play.

3. Top 125 (medical)

Daniel Berger
Bronson Burgoon

4. Major champions from the past five years

Zach Johnson
Jimmy Walker

5. Players Championship winners from the past five years

6. The Tour Championship winners from 2017 and 2018; FedEx Cup champion for 2018–19 season

7. World Golf Championship winners from the past three years

8. Memorial Tournament and Arnold Palmer Invitational winners from the past three years

Jason Dufner

9. Top 50 from the Official World Golf Ranking

Christiaan Bezuidenhout
Matt Fitzpatrick
Jazz Janewattananond
Victor Perez
Erik van Rooyen
Matt Wallace
Bernd Wiesberger

Shugo Imahira and Lee Westwood did not play.

10. Senior Players champion from prior year

Retief Goosen

11. Korn Ferry Tour points leader from prior season

Scottie Scheffler (12)

12. Points leader during the Korn Ferry Tour Finals

13. Top 10 current year FedEx Cup points leaders

14. Remaining positions and alternates filled through current year FedEx Cup standings

Tom Hoge (22nd)
Harris English (29th)
Mark Hubbard (30th)
Brendan Steele (40th)

Round summaries

First round
Thursday, March 12, 2020

Hideki Matsuyama tied the course record with a score of 63 (−9). Following the round, the PGA Tour canceled the remainder of the event due to the COVID-19 pandemic.

Note: Four players only completed 17 holes, with the lowest scorer on 1 under par when play was cancelled.

Scorecard of Hideki Matsuyama

{|class="wikitable" span = 50 style="font-size:85%;
|-
|style="background: Red;" width=10|
|Eagle
|style="background: Pink;" width=10|
|Birdie
|style="background: PaleGreen;" width=10|
|Bogey
|style="background: Green;" width=10|
|Double bogey
|}

References

External links

Official Media Guide
 	

2020
2020 in golf
2020 in American sports
2020 in sports in Florida
March 2020 sports events in the United States
Sports events curtailed due to the COVID-19 pandemic